The Ran Wei–Later Zhao War, or Wei–Zhao War, was a conflict in northern China in 350 CE, during the chaotic Sixteen Kingdoms period. In 350, Ran Min proclaimed himself emperor of Wei amid the succession struggles of the Later Zhao dynasty. The Jie people, who founded the Later Zhao, did not accept Ran Min's rule and rose against him; they were joined by many other dynasties established by the Five Barbarians that also opposed Ran Min. The resulting war ended with a decisive victory for Ran Min.

Background

By 350, struggles within the Later Zhao dynasty benefited Ran Min, who took over the regime and massacred the entire Shi family and the Jie people in the capital, who ruled Later Zhao. However, Ran Min failed to control the city of Xiangguo (襄國, in modern Xintai, Hebei), where Shi Zhi declared himself emperor.

Course of the war

Outbreak of the war

Shi Zhi had been a Later Zhao general at Xiāngguó. When he heard that Ran Min had massacred the Shi family and declared himself emperor, Shi Zhi rebelled against Ran Min. He was quickly joined by several other Later Zhao border armies, mostly of Jie soldiers who despised Ran Min's rule.

In the eighth month, four Zhao generals converged to attack Yecheng. They were defeated by Ran Min's forces at Cangting (蒼亭). 28,000 Zhao soldiers were killed.

Battle of Xiangguo

Meanwhile, Ran Min's army met the main Zhao forces under Shi Zhi and defeated them at the Battle of Yecheng. In the spring of 351, Ran Min besieged Shi Zhi's capital, Xiāngguó. Shi Zhi sought aid from Former Yan's prince Murong Jun and was able to deal Ran a major defeat. At this time, the Xiongnu soldiers in Yecheng also rebelled, captured Ran Min's son Ran Yin, and surrendered to Shi Zhi, who executed Ran Yin. Ran Min was thought to be dead, but when he appeared in Yecheng, the city was calmed. 

Shi Zhi ordered his general Liu Xian to besiege Yecheng, but Ran Min defeated Liu in the siege, awing the latter so much that Liu agreed that upon his return to Xiāngguó he would kill Shi Zhi and surrender. He did so and sent Shi Zhi's head to Ran Min, who had the head burned on a busy street in Yecheng.

However, Liu Xian continued the war against Ran Min. In 352, Xian attacked Changshan (常山). Ran Min led 8,000 cavalry troops to break the siege and decisively defeated him. General Cao Fuju (曹伏駒) opened Xiangguo's gates to Ran Min. Liu Xian and many other Zhao officials and generals were executed and Xiangguo's population was forcibly relocated to Yecheng.

References

Sources

Li, Bo; Zheng Yin (Chinese) (2001) 5000 years of Chinese history, Inner Mongolian People's publishing corp,
Book of Jin.

Later Zhao
Wars involving Imperial China
Jin dynasty (266–420)
Genocides in Asia